Lampsilis fullerkati, the Waccamaw fatmucket, is a species of freshwater mussel, an aquatic bivalve mollusk in the family Unionidae, the river mussels. This species is endemic to the United States.

References

Molluscs of the United States
fullerkati
Molluscs described in 1984
Taxonomy articles created by Polbot
Endemic fauna of North Carolina